SciTech, Scitech or Sci Tech may refer to:

Businesses and organizations
 Scitech, a not-for-profit science and technology organization in Western Australia
 Sci-Tech Daresbury, a science-related business campus near Daresbury, Cheshire, England
 SciTech Software, a developer of display-related software

High schools
 SciTech High, in Harrisburg, Pennsylvania
 The Science Academy of South Texas, in Mercedes, Texas; also known as SciTech

Other uses
 SciTech (conference), an American Institute of Aeronautics and Astronautics conference
 SciTech (magazine), a Serbian science magazine
 SciTech SNAP, an operating system

See also
 
 
 
 
 
Science
Technology